Ekaterina Evgenyevna Alexandrova (born 15 November 1994) is a Russian professional tennis player.

She has won three WTA singles titles, three WTA 125 titles and seven singles titles on the ITF Circuit. On 26 September 2022, she reached her best singles ranking of No. 21. On 26 September 2022, she also peaked at No. 58 in the WTA doubles rankings

Personal life
Since 1996, Alexandrova has been living and training in Prague, Czech Republic, with her parents and two siblings, a brother and a sister. They moved after travelling to the city for a youth tournament, attracted by the local availability of tennis courts compared to Russia. According to the player, the Russian Tennis Federation didn't know about her existence before 2016 and she has never been good enough to cause interest from the Czech one (Czech Tennis Association or ) in terms of citizenship switch. However, she has long been tempted by the easier life possibility with a Czech passport, especially considering travel visas, but wasn't able to implement the opportunity at a certain point — after collecting all the necessary documents she couldn't decide if another citizenship is really the right decision for her, as a matter of fact. She hasn't applied for the Czech citizenship yet.

Alexandrova speaks Russian and Czech fluently, and also English, to a lesser extent. Her father Evgeny is her coach and Steffi Graf was her childhood tennis idol. Among the contemporary players, she mostly admires Serena Williams and Roger Federer.

Tennis career

2016: WTA Tour debut, Grand Slam debut, first WTA 125 title
Despite starting the year as the world No. 291, Alexandrova clinched her fifth ITF title at the $10k event in Trnava.

Alexandrova then made her WTA Tour singles debut at the 2016 Katowice Open, where she qualified for the main draw after surviving the qualifying rounds as an unseeded player. In her first WTA main draw match, she defeated world No. 115, Klára Koukalová, before falling to eventual finalist Camila Giorgi in three sets.

In the first grass-court tournament of her career, she qualified for a Grand Slam tournament for the first time at the Wimbledon Championships. She was only able to enter the qualifying draw after ten players ahead of her withdrew and it was also her first Grand Slam appearance, prevailing 14-12 and 13-11 against Stephanie Vogt and Harriet Dart, respectively, to reach the main draw. Overall, she played 108 games in just three matches. In the first round, she defeated former world No. 1, Ana Ivanovic, in straight sets, causing one of the biggest upsets in the tournament.

Immediately after her Wimbledon run, Alexandrova returned onto clay and reached the final of the ITS Cup, a $50k event, losing to compatriot and top seed Elizaveta Kulichkova in three sets. At the Tournoi de Québec, she claimed the biggest win of her career against world No. 59, Julia Görges, in the first round.

Entering the Open de Limoges, a WTA 125 event, as the world No. 133, Alexandrova caused a huge shock by ending the season with the biggest title of her career. En route, she defeated three big local favourites: fourth-seeded Pauline Parmentier in the second round, second-seeded Alizé Cornet in the semifinals, and top-seeded world No. 24, Caroline Garcia, in the final.

2017: Top 100 debut

In the 2017 season, Alexandrova continued to be a constant presence on the WTA Tour but not achieving any major success. She received direct entry into the Australian Open main draw for the first time in her career, but lost to compatriot and 30th seed Ekaterina Makarova in the first round.

She made her top-100 debut with consecutive title runs a $60k events Pingshan Open and Open de Seine-et-Marne. Making her first French Open main-draw appearance, she beat Kateřina Siniaková before falling short of eventual semifinalist and world No. 2, Karolína Plíšková, in three sets. At the Wimbledon Championships, Alexandrova lost to eventual champion Garbiñe Muguruza in the first round.

Alexandrova qualified for a Premier 5 tournament for the first time at the Rogers Cup, but lost to world No. 6 and eventual finalist, Caroline Wozniacki, in the second round. At the Open de Limoges, she lost in the quarterfinals to Antonia Lottner as the defending champion.

2018: Maiden WTA final

Alexandrova enjoyed a breakthrough season on the WTA Tour in the year. 

At the Australian Open, she was beaten by fellow hard-hitting Madison Keys in the second round, winning just one game in the process.

After some mediocre results, Alexandrova fell out of the top 100. However, she managed to make the semifinals of $100k events, the Slovak Open and Ilkley Trophy. Alongside a run to the final of the $100k event, the Hungarian Open, she returned to the top 100 after a brief period.

She made her first WTA quarterfinal at the Korea Open, clinching her first top-10 victory over world No. 10, Jeļena Ostapenko, in straight sets. Alexandrova made an astonishing run at another international tournament, now in Linz, Austria, reaching the final of a WTA tournament for the first time. Sailing through the qualifying rounds with the loss of just four games, Alexandrova beat compatriot Anastasia Pavlyuchenkova in straight sets to reach her first WTA semifinal. There, she recovered from a bagel to beat former top-10 player Andrea Petkovic and booked her spot in the final. However, she was defeated by Camila Giorgi in straight sets, but nonetheless made her return to the top 100 with her fantastic run.

She ended the season by tradition at the Open de Limoges, winning the title for the second time in her career after beating Evgeniya Rodina in straight sets. This victory solidified her place in the top 100, finding herself at the 73rd spot of the rankings after the tournament.

2019: Russian No. 1

In 2019, Alexandrova continued to earn more success on the WTA Tour.

She began her season at the Shenzhen Open, where she lost in the second round to eventual champion and top seed Aryna Sabalenka. 

Playing in a WTA tournament main draw at home for the first time, Alexandrova prevailed in the qualifying rounds before reaching the quarterfinals of the St. Petersburg Trophy where she fell to Sabalenka, in straight sets once again. She then set a new career-high ranking of No. 59 after a semifinal run at the Hungarian Open where she held five match points against eventual champion Alison Van Uytvanck.

With her best result at a Premier Mandatory event, Alexandrova reached the third round of the Premier Mandatory Indian Wells Open by beating world No. 13 Wozniacki, in three sets. She did not perform well on clay-court tournaments, except at the French Open, reaching the third round of a Grand Slam tournament for the first time in her career. She beat 30th seed Mihaela Buzărnescu in the first round, before stunning 2010 finalist Samantha Stosur in the second round.

In the grass-court season, Alexandrova made it into the quarterfinals of the Eastbourne International and Rosmalen Championships, losing there to eventual champions Karolína Plíšková] and Alison Riske, respectively. A disappointing first-round exit at Wimbledon followed, losing to Kateřina Siniaková in three sets.

She achieved her best run in a Premier 5 tournament at the Canadian Open, reaching the third round as qualifier. After leading throughout the majority of both sets, Alexandrova fell to Serena Williams in straight sets. Alexandrova also led world No. 4, Simona Halep, by a set and a break in the second round of the Western & Southern Open, but failed to sustain her high level. She was defeated by 33rd seed Zhang Shuai in the second round of the US Open, a player whom she defeated in Cincinnati earlier on. Nonetheless, she became the highest-ranked Russian after this tournament.

Alexandrova reached her second career WTA semifinal at the Korea Open, where she beat Kristie Ahn in the quarterfinals by hitting a personal-record 22 aces. Another strong run came at the Premier Mandatory event, the China Open. There, she stunned world No. 5, Halep, in straight sets after her disappointment in Cincinnati, claiming the biggest win of her career. However, she was defeated by compatriot Daria Kasatkina in straight sets.

Defending finalist points at the Linz Open, Alexandrova rolled into the semifinals but failed to convert her match points against Jeļena Ostapenko and leading in both the second and final sets. Making her main-draw debut at the Kremlin Cup, the Russian made the quarterfinals although her run was eventually stopped by the in-form Karolína Muchová. For the third time in her career, Alexandrova closed out her season with a triumph at the Open de Limoges, this time lifting the trophy as the top seed.

2020: First WTA title, Fed Cup debut
Alexandrova started the 2020 season at the Shenzhen Open. Seeded fifth, she won her first WTA singles title beating seventh seed Elena Rybakina in the final. As a result, she became the first player to win a WTA tournament in the new decade. At the Australian Open where she was seeded at a Grand Slam event for the first time, she reached the third round where she lost to seventh seed and last year finalist, Petra Kvitová.

Alexandrova then represented Russia for the first time in her career, leading the team against Romania in the Fed Cup as the Russian No. 1. On her debut, she led Russia to a tight 3-2 win over the home team, defeating Elena-Gabriela Ruse in straight sets and Ana Bogdan in a tight three-setter, helping to book Russia's spot in the inaugural Fed Cup Finals. She next participated at the St. Petersburg Trophy, where she reached the semifinals losing in three sets to defending champion and eventual champion, Kiki Bertens. At the Qatar Open, she suffered a first-round exit at the hands of Amanda Anisimova. The WTA Tour was suspended from March through July due to the COVID-19 pandemic.

When the WTA resumed tournament play in August, Alexandrova competed at the Palermo Ladies Open. Seeded eighth, she lost in the second round to eventual champion Fiona Ferro. Seeded fifth at the Prague Open, she was defeated in the first round by qualifier Lesia Tsurenko. At the Western & Southern Open, she lost in the second round to American qualifier Christina McHale. The tournament was held at the USTA BJK National Tennis Center for the first time, lowering the risk of the transmission of the virus behind closed doors. At the same competition ground, she stunned the returning former world No. 1 and three-time champion, Kim Clijsters, in the first round of the US Open after recovering from a set down. However, she failed to back up her good win as she fell short to Caty McNally in the second round.

At the Italian Open in Rome, Alexandrova was defeated in the first round by tenth seed Elena Rybakina. Seeded seventh at the Internationaux de Strasbourg, she lost in the second round to Kateřina Siniaková. Seeded 27th at the French Open, she made it to the third round in which she was defeated by third seed Elina Svitolina.

At the first edition of the J&T Banka Ostrava Open, Alexandrova lost in the first round to eighth seed Anett Kontaveit. Her final tournament of the year was the Upper Austria Ladies Linz. Seeded fourth, she reached the semifinals where she was defeated by second seed Elise Mertens.

Alexandrova ended the season ranked 33.

2021: Olympics debut, BJK Cup champion, biggest career final at home
Alexandrova started her season at the first edition of the Abu Dhabi Open. Seeded 17th, she lost in the third round to second seed Elina Svitolina. Seeded ninth at the first edition of the Gippsland Trophy, she upset top seed Simona Halep in her quarterfinal match after defeating French Open champion Iga Świątek. She was defeated in the semifinal by Kaia Kanepi. Seeded 29th at the Australian Open, she lost in the third round to top seed Ashleigh Barty.

As the top seed in Lyon, Alexandrova was defeated in the first round by qualifier and eventual champion, Clara Tauson. At the Dubai Championships, she lost in a three-set first round battle to Coco Gauff after saving multiple match points and having match points of her own. Competing as the top seed at the St. Petersburg Ladies Trophy, she reached the quarterfinals where she was defeated by compatriot and eventual finalist, Margarita Gasparyan. Seeded 30th in Miami, she lost in the third round to fifth seed Elina Svitolina.

At the Porsche Tennis Grand Prix, Alexandrova made it to the quarterfinals in a WTA clay tournament for the first time in her career where she was defeated by second seed Simona Halep. In Madrid, she lost in the first round to 12th seed Victoria Azarenka. At the Italian Open, she was defeated in the third round by Jessica Pegula. Seeded third at the Internationaux de Strasbourg, she reached the quarterfinals where she lost to fifth seed and eventual champion, Barbora Krejčíková. Seeded 32nd at the French Open, she beat seven-time Grand Slam champion Venus Williams in the first round. She was defeated in the second round by eventual champion Krejčíková.

Alexandrova played only one grass-court tournament to prepare for Wimbledon. At the German Open, she stunned second seed Elina Svitolina in the second round for her second top 10 win of the year. She lost in the quarterfinals to fifth seed and eventual finalist, Belinda Bencic. Seeded 32nd at Wimbledon, she was shocked by qualifier María Camila Osorio Serrano in the second round.

Representing Russia at the Summer Olympics, Alexandrova lost in the second round to Nadia Podoroska after upsetting Elise Mertens in the first round.

Alexandrova lost in the opening rounds of the Western & Southern Open and the Tennis in the Land events to Jennifer Brady and Irina-Camelia Begu respectively. She ended a three-match losing streak at the US Open, defeating former Grand Slam finalist Sara Errani in the first round with 42 winners. However, she was stunned by lucky loser Kamilla Rakhimova in the second round.

She lost to Tauson for the second time in 2021 at the Luxembourg Open before she retired in the final qualifying round of the Ostrava Open. After recuperating for more than a month, Alexandrova returned for the Kremlin Cup. She took the first set against top-10 player Ons Jabeur in the first round before her opponent was forced to retire. The Russian then defeated Anhelina Kalinina in straight sets to reach her first quarterfinal since June. She then sealed a huge upset over world No. 2, Aryna Sabalenka, in straight sets before earning her third top 10 win of the tournament over Maria Sakkari when the Greek was forced to retire down 1–4 in the opening set. Leading 6–4, 4–0 in the final set against Anett Kontaveit, she was unable to close out the victory and eventually lost in three sets.

Alexandrova was part of the Russia team that won the inaugural Billie Jean King Cup Finals in Prague. She lost the only match she competed in the week against Clara Burel, but Russia was still able to defeat France 2–1 in that tie and win the title at the end of the week.

2022: Top 20 debut, two WTA titles
Alexandrova started her season at 2022 Adelaide International 1. She lost in the first round to Leylah Fernandez which is followed by a  second round exit to Garbiñe Muguruza in Sydney. Unseeded at the Australian Open, she lost to Bernarda Pera in the first round. After defeating Camila Giorgi, she was defeated by Maria Sakkari in the second round of St. Petersburg. Alexandrova suffered early exits in both Indian Wells and Miami  losing to Simona Halep and Victoria Azarenka, respectively in the second rounds.

Alexandrova eventually turned her underwhelming season around and reached the semifinals of the Charleston Open, defeating Allie Kiick, Zheng Qinwen, Karolina Pliskova and Magda Linette in route. She lost to the eventual champion Belinda Bencic, in straight sets. Following a second-round exit in Stuttgart to Anett Kontaveit, she reached her first WTA 1000 semifinals in Madrid from qualies cruising past Ostapenko and Anisimova in route. She lost to the eventual champion Ons Jabeur in the semifinal. However, it was followed by a second round appearance in Rome to Maria Sakkari. Seeded 30th in the French Open, she lost to Irina-Camelia Begu in the second round.

She won her second WTA Tour title at the Rosmalen Open cruising past Dayana Yastremska, Anhelina Kalinina, Caty McNally, Veronika Kudermetova and Aryna Sabalenka dropping only one set. Following a second round loss to Daria Kasatkina in Berlin, she suffered a wrist injury and took a break.

She suffered some early exits after returning from injury, losing in the second rounds of Cincinnati and Cleveland. Seeded 28th in the US Open, she reached the second round where she was defeated by Lauren Davis in three sets.

Alexandrova won her second title of the season in Seoul defeating Jelena Ostapenko in the final. She continued her great run of form in Ostrava  as she surges into the semifinals with wins over Victoria Azarenka,  Daria Kasatkina and Tereza Martincová.  In the semifinals, she was ultimately defeated by world No. 1, Iga Świątek, in three sets. After reaching the semifinals in Ostrava, she made her top-20 debut in the WTA rankings on 10th October 2022. Seeded 15th in Guadalajara, she struggled with the high altitude as she lost to Camila Osorio in the first round.

2023
Alexandrova started her season at Adelaide International 1. She lost in the first round to Marketa Vondrousova in three sets. It was followed by a second round withdrawal from Adelaide International 2 after getting a first-round win over Jaimee Fourlis in straight sets.   Seeded 19th at the Australian Open, Alexandrova defeated Ysaline Bonaventure and Taylor Townsend, before falling to Magda Linette in the third round.

Sponsorships

Alexandrova has been endorsed by Fila for apparel and shoes since 2020. She was sponsored by Lotto earlier in her career. She is also endorsed by Wilson for rackets, specifically using Wilson blade range.

Performance timelines

Only main-draw results in WTA Tour, Grand Slam tournaments, Fed Cup/Billie Jean King Cup and Olympic Games are included in win–loss records.

Singles
Current after the 2023 Indian Wells Open.

Doubles
Current after the 2023 Adelaide International 1.

WTA career finals

Singles: 5 (3 titles, 2 runner-ups)

Doubles: 1 (1 title)

WTA 125 tournament finals

Singles: 3 (3 titles)

Doubles: 1 (runner-up)

ITF Circuit finals

Singles: 15 (7 titles, 8 runner–ups)

Billie Jean King Cup participation

Singles: 3 (2–1)

WTA Tour career earnings
Current after the 2022 Korea Open.
{|cellpadding=3 cellspacing=0 border=1 style=border:#aaa;solid:1px;border-collapse:collapse;text-align:center;
|-style=background:#eee;font-weight:bold
|width="90"|Year
|width="100"|Grand Slam <br/ >titles'|width="100"|WTA <br/ >titles
|width="100"|Total <br/ >titles
|width="120"|Earnings ($)
|width="100"|Money list rank
|-
|2014
|0
|0
|0
| align="right" |12,800
|415
|-
|2015
|0
|0
|0
| align="right" |12,767
|439
|-
|2016
|0
|0
|0
| align="right" |117,410
|174
|-
|2017
|0
|0
|0
| align="right" |321,619
|110
|-
|2018
|0
|0
|0
| align="right" |318,719
| 119
|-
|2019
|0
|0
|0
| align="right" |804,311
|51
|-
|2020
|0
|1
|1
| align="right" |679,382
|24
|-
|2021
|0
|0
|0
|align="right"|421,836
|42
|-
|2022
|0
|2
|2
|align="right"|1,041,182
|32
|-style="font-weight:bold;"
|Career
|0
|3
|3
| align="right" |4,152,005
|161
|}
Head-to-head records
Record against top 10 playersActive players are in boldface.''

Top 10 wins

Awards
National
The Russian Cup in the nominations:
Olympians-2020;
Team of the Year: 2021.

Notes

References

External links

 
 
 
 

1994 births
Living people
Russian expatriate sportspeople in the Czech Republic
Russian female tennis players
Tennis players from Chelyabinsk
Olympic tennis players of Russia
Tennis players at the 2020 Summer Olympics